The Wiggly Big Show is the Wiggles' eighth video and their second concert video, after Wiggledance! It was released in October 1999, and like Wiggledance, was only released in the Australia region.

The concert was taped at the Sydney Entertainment Centre during their Toot Toot! tour. The video includes backstage segments that were edited in afterwards.

Song list
 Officer Beaples' Dance
 Toot Toot, Chugga Chugga, Big Red Car
 Look Both Ways
 Can You Point Your Fingers and Do The Twist?
 Rock-A-Bye Your Bear
 The Monkey Dance
 Silver Bells That Ring in the Night
 We're Dancing with Wags The Dog
 Tap Wags
 Our Boat is Rocking on the Sea
 Captain Feathersword Fell Asleep on His Pirate Ship (Quack Quack)
 Bucket of Dew
 Romp Bomp A Stomp
 Hot Potato
 Do the Wiggle Groove
 Move Your Arms Like Henry
 Go Captain Feathersword, Ahoy!
 Wiggly Medley
 Wiggly Christmas Medley

Cast

The Wiggles
Greg Page
Anthony Field
Murray Cook
Jeff Fatt

Also featuring
Paul Paddick as Captain Feathersword
Leeanne Ashley as Dorothy the Dinosaur
Edward Rooke as Wags the Dog
Reem Hanwell as Henry the Octopus
Leanne Halloran as Officer Beaples
Cassandra Halloran, Jessica Halloran, Kristen Knox, Cameron Lewis, Joanna Murphy, Scott Porter, Sian Ryan and Larissa Wright as dancers

Production
The video was filmed during the group's concert tour to promote the Toot, Toot! album and companion video. Footage from multiple concerts was used. The "Wiggly Christmas Medley" has been incorporated into some episodes in the television series and added to the 1999 version of Wiggly, Wiggly, Christmas.

See also
 Wiggledance!
 Live Hot Potatoes!

Notes

References

External links

1999 video albums
1990s English-language films
The Wiggles videos
Australian children's musical films